Aspartyl aminopeptidase is an enzyme that in humans is encoded by the DNPEP gene.

Function 
The protein encoded by this gene is an aminopeptidase which prefers acidic amino acids, and specifically favors aspartic acid over glutamic acid. It is thought to be a cytosolic protein involved in general metabolism of intracellular proteins.

Model organisms
Model organisms have been used in the study of DNPEP function. A conditional knockout mouse line called Dnpeptm1e(EUCOMM)Wtsi was generated at the Wellcome Trust Sanger Institute. Male and female animals underwent a standardized phenotypic screen to determine the effects of deletion. Additional screens performed: In-depth immunological phenotyping.

See also

References

Further reading

External links 
 The MEROPS online database for peptidases and their inhibitors: M18.002
 PDBe-KB provides an overview of all the structure information available in the PDB for Human Aspartyl aminopeptidase (DNPEP)

EC 3.4.11